Boss Tenors (subtitled Straight Ahead from Chicago August 1961) is an album by saxophonists Gene Ammons and Sonny Stitt recorded in Chicago in 1961 and originally released on the Verve label.

Reception
The Allmusic review stated "Tenor saxophonists Gene Ammons and Sonny Stitt co-led a small group in 1950, and this follow-up, taped in the studio in 1961, finds the two picking up where they left off".

Track listing 
 "Blues Up and Down" (Gene Ammons, Sonny Stitt) - 8:47
 "Counter Clockwise" (Sonny Stitt) - 9:38
 "There Is No Greater Love" (Isham Jones, Marty Symes) - 6:30
 "The One Before This" (Gene Ammons)  - 7:09
 "Autumn Leaves" (Joseph Kosma, Johnny Mercer, Jacques Prévert) - 6:32

Personnel 
Gene Ammons - tenor saxophone
Sonny Stitt - tenor saxophone (tracks 2-5), alto saxophone (track 1)
John Houston - piano
Buster Williams - bass
George Brown - drums

References 

1961 albums
Verve Records albums
Gene Ammons albums
Sonny Stitt albums
Albums produced by Creed Taylor
Collaborative albums